Earlston Sevens is an annual rugby sevens event held by Earlston RFC, in Earlston, Scotland. This was one of a group of Sevens tournaments instated after the First World War extending the original Borders Spring Circuit. The Earlston Sevens began in 1923.

The Earlston Sevens is part of the Kings of the Sevens championship run by the Border League.

2019's Earlston Sevens was played on 5 May 2019. It was won by Watsonians.

Invited Sides

Various sides have been invited to play in the Earlston Sevens tournament throughout the years. The Royal Scots army side was invited in 2003.

Past winners

See also
 Earlston RFC
 Borders Sevens Circuit
 Scottish Rugby Union

References 

Rugby sevens competitions in Scotland
Rugby union in the Scottish Borders